Lithium tetrachloroaluminate is an inorganic compound with the formula . It consists of lithium cations  and tetrahedral tetrachloroaluminate anions .

Uses
Lithium tetrachloroaluminate is used in some lithium batteries. A solution of lithium tetrachloroaluminate in thionyl chloride is the liquid cathode and electrolyte in those baterries, e.g. the lithium-thionyl chloride cell. Another cathode-electrolyte formulation is lithium tetrachloroaluminate + thionyl chloride + sulfur dioxide + bromine.

Reactions
Reacts violently with water, alcohols and oxidizing agents. Upon exposure to heat or fire, it decomposes emitting irritating and toxic fumes and smoke of hydrogen chloride, lithium oxide and aluminium oxide.

Toxicity
Upon contact with skin, causes burns. Inhalation causes caughing and corrosive injuries to the respiratory system, which can lead to pneumonia. This compound is extremely destructive to the mucous tissues. May cause pulmonary edema and edema of the larynx, laryngitis and edema of bronchi, leading to shortness of breath. May cause damage to the eyes, headache and nausea. If swallowed, may cause damage.

References

Lithium salts
Tetrachloroaluminates